To Shoot an Elephant is a 2009 documentary film about the 2008-2009 Gaza War directed by Alberto Arce and Mohammad Rujailahk.

References
 
 The complete film in low resolution on dotSUB with translation and subtitles in 7 languages
 The complete film in medium resolution with hardcoded english subtitles

External links

Gaza Strip
2009 films
Documentary films about the Israeli–Palestinian conflict
2009 documentary films
2000s English-language films
2000s Arabic-language films
Spanish documentary films
Articles containing video clips
2009 multilingual films
Spanish multilingual films